Homer Clisson Bliss (August 16, 1904 – April 1970) was a professional American football player for the Chicago Cardinals. He attended Washington & Jefferson College, where he played center for the football team.  When he graduated in 1927, The Pittsburgh Press said that he was "likely to be the worst-missed player in years."

Notes
 

Players of American football from Michigan
Chicago Cardinals players
Washington & Jefferson Presidents football players
1904 births
1970 deaths
Washington & Jefferson College alumni